Hussein Hajj Hassan (born 1960) is a Lebanese politician and minister of industry.

Early life and education
Hajj Hassan was born into a Shia family in the Beqaa Valley in 1960. He holds a PhD in molecular biophysical chemistry, which he received from the University of Orléans, France in 1987.

Political career and views
Hajj Hassan is a member of the Lebanese Shia party Hezbollah. He ran on the latter's electoral list in Lebanon's 1996 general election and was elected MP of the Beqaa's Baalbeck/Hermel constituency. In May 1998, he argued that although Islamic state is an ideal solution, Hezbollah is aware of its inapplicability in Lebanon.

He was reelected in the 2000, 2005 and 2009 polls. In 2009, he was among Hezbollah's 11 members of parliament. In June 2009, he met with the then European Union foreign policy chief Javier Solana in Beirut, representing Hezbollah. From 2000 to 2005 he led the parliamentary commission on agriculture and tourism. He is part of the "Loyalty to the Resistance", an opposition parliamentary bloc.

He was named on 9 November 2009 minister of agriculture in Saad Hariri's national unity government. In January 2011, he and other two ministers, Gebran Bassil and Mohamad Jawad Khalifeh, resigned from the cabinet, leading to the collapse of Hariri government.

He was appointed to Najib Mikati's cabinet again as a minister of agriculture in June 2011.

References

See also
 Lebanese government of November 2009
 Members of the 2009-2013 Lebanese Parliament

1960 births
Living people
University of Orléans alumni
Members of the Parliament of Lebanon
Lebanese Shia Muslims
Hezbollah politicians
Government ministers of Lebanon